Kolai-Pallas District is a district in Hazara Division of Khyber Pakhtunkhwa province in Pakistan. It was a sub division of Kohistan district of Hazara division till it was made a separate district in 2017.

Overview and history 
Kolai-Pallas Kohistan was carved as District out of  the District Lower Kohistan by Upgrading the old Pallas Sub-Division in 2017. On 31 May 2018, Battera Kolai was carved out of Pallas tehsil making two tehsils in total for Kolai-Pallas.

Farhatullah Khan Marwat (PMS) was posted as the first ever Deputy Commissioner (Administrative Head)  of the District by the Provincial Government of Khyber Pakhtunkhwa.

Demographics 
At the time of the 2017 census the district had a population of 274,923, of which 149,104 were males and 125,814 females. The entire population was rural. 7 people in the district were from religious minorities.

The region is dominated by Dardic peoples speaking Kohistani languages. Originally these peoples practiced a form of animistic religion similar to ancient Vedic religion, but were over the centuries converted to Islam. These peoples form 91.26% of the population. Pashto-speakers are the second-largest group and make up 7.09% of the population.

Administrative Units 
The district currently has 2 Tehsils.

 Battera Kolai
Palas
The district is decided into 13 Wards (Previously known as Union Councils), and 52 Village Councils.

Provincial Assembly

See also

 Kohistan
 Districts of Khyber Pakhtunkhwa

References 

Districts of Khyber Pakhtunkhwa